The Emperor of Lies is a 2009 novel by Swedish author Steve Sem-Sandberg. It won the August Prize in 2009.

References

2009 Swedish novels
Swedish-language novels
August Prize-winning works
Novels set in Łódź
Novels set during World War II
Albert Bonniers Förlag books